Sherlock Biosciences is a biotechnology company based in Cambridge, Massachusetts developing diagnostic tests using CRISPR-Cas13. The company was founded in 2019 by Feng Zhang, Omar Abudayyeh, and Jonathan Gootenberg of the Broad Institute. 

Cas13 was discovered by Zheng and Eugene Koonin using computational biology methods, and then further characterized by Jennifer Doudna's team at the University of California, Berkeley. In 2020, both Sherlock Biosciences and Mammoth Biosciences from Doudna's lab at UC Berkeley used their similar CRISPR technologies to develop tests for COVID-19.

In 2021, Sherlock Biosciences and The Forsyth Institute entered into a strategic partnership with its focus being on the research and development of products related to the “detection of human biomarkers in oral cavity and other oral health applications."

See also
Mammoth Biosciences

External links 
Company webpage

References

American companies established in 2019
Biotechnology companies of the United States
Health care companies based in Massachusetts
Life sciences industry
Medical diagnosis